Thomas Cartwright Cullwick (5 March 1862 – 8 September 1948) was a priest who worked as a missionary for the Anglican Church in Melanesia and then held several incumbencies in New Zealand.

Cullwick was born at Hadley, Shropshire. He was ordained deacon in 1886, and priest in 1889. He was a missionary on Banks Island from 1887 to 1902 when he became  Archdeacon of Southern Melanesia, a post he held until 1906.He was then on Norfolk Island from 1906 to 1903. He then served in New Zealand, holding posts at Waipawa, Hawkes Bay, Takapau, Te Rehunga and Ormondville. He is buried in Dannevirke on New Zealand's North Island.

References

Anglican missionaries in Vanuatu
19th-century Anglican priests
20th-century New Zealand Anglican priests
Clergy from Shropshire
1862 births
1948 deaths
Archdeacons of Southern Melanesia
English Anglican missionaries
Anglican missionaries in New Zealand
Anglican missionaries in Norfolk Island